Aita (also spelled Eita in Etruscan inscriptions) is the name of the Etruscan equivalent to the Greek Hades, the god of the underworld.

Images
Aita is a relatively late addition to the Etruscan pantheon, appearing in iconography and in Etruscan text beginning in the 4th century BC, and is heavily influenced by his Greek counterpart, Hades.  Aita is pictured in only a few instances in Etruscan tomb painting, such as in the Golini Tomb from Orvieto and the tomb of Orcus II from Tarquinia. In these tomb paintings, he is shown with his consort Phersipnai, the Etruscan equivalent to the Greek Persephone.

Although Aita is very rarely depicted, he may appear enthroned and sometimes wears a wolf cap, borrowing a key attribute from the earlier Etruscan underworld wolf-deity, named Calu. Other examples of Aita in Etruscan art depict his abduction of Phersipnai. Aside from tomb painting, Aita may be identified in a few examples in other media, including on a 4th-century painted vase from Vulci, two 2nd century alabaster ash urns from Volterra, and a Red Figure 4th-3rd century Oinochoe.

References

Etruscan mythology
Etruscan gods
Underworld gods